The 2006 FIBA Africa Under-20 Championship for Women was the 2nd and last FIBA Africa Under-20 Championship for Women, played under the rules of FIBA, the world governing body for basketball, and the FIBA Africa thereof. The tournament was hosted by Mozambique from December 2 to 9 2006, with the games played at the Pavilhão do Maxaquene in Maputo.

Mali defeated Mozambique 49–47 in the final to win their first title. and securing a spot at the 2007 U-21 Women's World Cup.

Squads

Participants

Preliminary round 
Times given below are in UTC+2.

Knockout stage

Semifinals

Bronze medal match

Final

Final standings

Awards

All-Tournament Team
  Anabela Cossa
  Fanta Toure
  Magatte Sarr
  Naignouma Coulibaly
  Deolinda Gimo

Statistical Leaders

Individual Tournament Highs

Points

Rebounds

Assists

Steals

Blocks

Minutes

Individual Game Highs

Team Tournament Highs

Points per Game

Total Points

Rebounds

Assists

Steals

Blocks

2-point field goal percentage

3-point field goal percentage

Free throw percentage

Team Game highs

External links
Official Website

References

2006 FIBA Africa Under-20 Championship for Women
2006 FIBA Africa Under-20 Championship for Women
2006 FIBA Africa Under-20 Championship for Women
2006 in youth sport